Nonette-Orsonnette is a commune in the Puy-de-Dôme department of central France. The municipality was established on 1 January 2016 and consists of the former communes of Nonette and Orsonnette.

See also 
Communes of the Puy-de-Dôme department

References 

Communes of Puy-de-Dôme